Ongoni is a village on the island of Anjouan in the Comoros. According to the 1991 census the village had a population of 1280.

References

Populated places in Anjouan